The Meeting International in Arles, France was an annual athletics meet in which international athletes competed in the Decathlon and Heptathlon. The meeting took place in Stade Fernand Fournier in  early June. It was a part of the IAAF World Combined Events Challenge. The last edition of the event took place in 2009.

References

External links
Official website

Decathlon
Annual track and field meetings
Recurring sporting events established in 1997
World Athletics Combined Events Tour
Athletics competitions in France
Combined events competitions